The Federico García Lorca Garden (in French : jardin Federico-García-Lorca) is a public park situated on the 4th arrondissement of Paris, in the heart of the French capital.

Location 
The park is situated near the Seine river, downstairs to the quai de l'Hôtel de Ville.

This site is serviced by the Hôtel de Ville metro station and Pont Marie metro station.

The Hôtel de Ville Batobus stop is situated precisely on the park.

Tribute to Federico García Lorca 
The park is named after Spanish poet Federico García Lorca (1898-1936), assassinated in Andalusia by the Francisco Franco's Militia during the Spanish civil war, because of Republicans ideas and his homosexuality.

Points of interests 

 Hôtel de Ville, Paris.
 Le Marais.
 Views on Notre-Dame-de-Paris, île de la Cité and île Saint-Louis. 
 Jardin des Combattants-de-la-Nueve, tribute to the Spanish Republicans soldiers who liberated Paris on 24 August 1944.

References 

Parks in France
Gardens in Paris
Le Marais
Federico García Lorca
Tourist attractions in Paris